The Catholic Normal School and Pio Nono College, also known as Holy Family Normal School, was a paired institution (sharing the same faculty) in St. Francis, Wisconsin, which also included a high school component, founded in 1870 by Dr. Joseph Salzmann as the first Catholic normal school in the United States. The Normal School specialized in training young men in music education for Catholic boys' schools, while Pio Nono was a business school.

School for the deaf

St. John's School for the Deaf was founded as part of Pio Nono in 1876 as the Catholic Deaf and Dumb Asylum.  In its first year, the 17 students classes were held in the second floor of the Pio Nono gymnasium. A separate building for the school was completed in the summer of 1879 and dedicated in December of that year.  From 1889-1895 it operated as the coeducational St. John's Institute for Deaf Mutes.  In 1895, the institute became a fully independent school, and was no longer an entity within Pio Nono College.

College shut down 
The college and normal school portion was shut down in 1922, leaving Pio Nono High School, a Catholic boarding and day school for boys. In 1941, the high school was combined with minor seminary students transferred over from Saint Francis de Sales Seminary to form St. Francis Minor Seminary (1941-1963), later De Sales Preparatory Seminary (1963-1970), a four-year high school and junior college. Since in 1970 the official name was changed to De Sales Preparatory Seminary High School, presumably the junior college component was no longer in operation. In 1972, the high-school component (since 1965 again called Pio Nono High School) was merged with Don Bosco High School to become Thomas More High School, now Saint Thomas More H.S.

Notable alumni
 Ray Berres, Major League Baseball catcher
 Rudolph Gerken, bishop and archbishop
 J. Henry Goeke, Congressman from Ohio
 Daniel D. Hanna, restaurateur and Wisconsin legislator
 Jim Jodat, National Football League running back
 N. B. Nemmers, Iowa merchant and politician
 Edward Steichen, photographer

References

Schools of education in Wisconsin
Educational institutions established in 1870
1870 establishments in Wisconsin
1972 disestablishments in Wisconsin